The list presented here is a checklist of world bumblebees (Tribe Bombini) based on the Bombus phylogeny presented by Cameron et al (2007) and grouped by subgenus following the revision of Williams et al (2008). The bumblebee fossil record extends back to the Late Eocene in North America and England with the most diversity of fossils found during the Miocene.  The fossil species were discussed and revised by Dehon et al (2019).

Genus Bombus

Subgenus Alpigenobombus

Bombus angustus
Bombus breviceps
Bombus genalis
Bombus grahami
Bombus kashmirensis
Bombus nobilis
Bombus wurflenii

Subgenus Alpinobombus
Bombus alpinus
Bombus balteatus – golden-belted bumble bee
Bombus hyperboreus
Bombus kirbiellus
Bombus kluanensis
Bombus natvigi
Bombus neoboreus
Bombus polaris
Bombus pyrrhopygus

Subgenus Bombias

Bombus auricomus – black-and-gold bumble bee
Bombus confusus
Bombus nevadensis – Nevada bumble bee

Subgenus Bombus (sensu stricto)

Bombus affinis – rusty-patched bumble bee
Bombus cryptarum – cryptic bumble bee
Bombus franklini – Franklin's Bumblebee (extremely rare or possibly extinct)
Bombus hypocrita
Bombus ignitus
Bombus jacobsoni
Bombus lantschouensis
Bombus longipennis
Bombus lucorum – white-tailed bumblebee
Bombus magnus – northern white-tailed bumblebee
Bombus minshanicus
Bombus occidentalis – Western Yellow-banded Bumble Bee
Bombus patagiatus
Bombus sporadicus
Bombus terrestris – buff-tailed bumblebee or large earth bumblebee
Bombus terricola – yellow-banded bumble bee
Bombus tunicatus

Subgenus Cullumanobombus
Bombus baeri
Bombus brachycephalus
Bombus coccineus
Bombus crotchii – Crotch's bumble bee
Bombus cullumanus – Cullum's humble-bee or Cullum's bumblebee 
Bombus ecuadorius
Bombus fraternus – southern plains bumble bee
Bombus funebris
Bombus griseocollis – brown-belted bumble bee
Bombus handlirschi
Bombus haueri
Bombus hortulanus
Bombus macgregori
Bombus melaleucus
Bombus morrisoni 
†Bombus pristinus - Middle- Late Miocene, Kumi Formation, Euboea, Greece
†Bombus randeckensis
Bombus robustus
Bombus rohweri
Bombus rubicundus
Bombus rufocinctus – red-belted bumble bee
Bombus semenoviellus
†Bombus trophonius
Bombus tucumanus
Bombus unicus
Bombus vogti

Subgenus Kallobombus

Bombus soroeensis – broken-belted bumblebee

Subgenus Megabombus

Bombus argillaceus
Bombus bicoloratus
Bombus consobrinus
Bombus czerskii
Bombus diversus
Bombus gerstaeckeri
Bombus hortorum – (small) garden bumblebee
Bombus irisanensis
Bombus koreanus
Bombus longipes
Bombus melanopoda (extremely rare or possibly extinct)
Bombus portchinsky
Bombus religiosus
Bombus ruderatus – large garden bumblebee
Bombus saltuarius
Bombus securus
Bombus senex
Bombus supremus
Bombus sushkini
Bombus tichenkoi
Bombus trifasciatus
Bombus ussurensis

Subgenus Melanobombus

Bombus alagesianus
†Bombus cerdanyensis - Late Miocene, Bellver de Cerdanya, Spain
Bombus erzurumensis
Bombus eurythorax
Bombus eximius
Bombus festivus
Bombus formosellus
Bombus friseanus
Bombus incertoides
Bombus incertus
Bombus keriensis
Bombus ladakhensis
Bombus lapidarius – red-tailed bumblebee
Bombus miniatus
Bombus prshewalskyi
Bombus pyrosoma
Bombus qilianensis
Bombus richardsiellus
Bombus rufipes
Bombus rufofasciatus
Bombus semenovianus
Bombus sichelii
Bombus simillimus
Bombus tanguticus
Bombus tibeticus

Subgenus Mendacibombus

Bombus avinoviellus
†Bombus beskonakensis (Miocene, Bes Konak paleolake, Turkey)
Bombus convexus
Bombus handlirschianus
Bombus himalayanus
Bombus makarjini
Bombus margreiteri
Bombus marussinus
Bombus mendax
Bombus superbus
Bombus turkestanicus
Bombus waltoni

Subgenus Orientalibombus
Bombus braccatus
Bombus funerarius
Bombus haemorrhoidalis

Subgenus †Paraelectrobombus

†Bombus patriciae - Late Oligocene/Early Miocene, BesKonak paleolake, Ankara, Turkey

Subgenus Psithyrus

Bombus ashtoni – Ashton cuckoo bumble bee
Bombus barbutellus – Barbut's cuckoo-bee
Bombus bellardii
Bombus bohemicus – Gypsy's cuckoo bumble bee
Bombus branickii
Bombus campestris
Bombus chinensis
Bombus citrinus – lemon cuckoo bumble bee
Bombus coreanus
Bombus cornutus
Bombus expolitus
Bombus ferganicus
Bombus fernaldae – Fernald's cuckoo bumble bee
Bombus flavidus
Bombus insularis – indiscriminate cuckoo bumble bee
Bombus maxillosus
Bombus monozonus
Bombus morawitzianus
Bombus norvegicus
Bombus novus
Bombus perezi
Bombus quadricolor
Bombus rupestris
Bombus skorikovi
Bombus suckleyi – Suckley's cuckoo bumble bee
Bombus sylvestris – forest cuckoo bumble bee
Bombus tibetanus
Bombus turneri
Bombus variabilis – variable cuckoo bumble bee
Bombus vestalis – vestal cuckoo bumble bee

Subgenus Pyrobombus

Bombus abnormis
Bombus ardens
Bombus avanus
Bombus beaticola
Bombus bifarius – two-form bumble bee
Bombus bimaculatus – two-spotted bumble bee
Bombus biroi
Bombus brodmannicus
Bombus caliginosus – obscure bumble bee
Bombus centralis – Great Basin bumble bee
Bombus cingulatus – small tree bumble bee
Bombus cockerelli – Cockerell's bumble bee
Bombus ephippiatus
Bombus flavescens
Bombus flavifrons – yellow-fronted bumble bee
Bombus frigidus – frigid bumble bee
Bombus haematurus
Bombus huntii – Hunt's bumble bee
Bombus hypnorum – tree bumble bee
Bombus impatiens – common eastern bumble bee
Bombus infirmus
Bombus infrequens
Bombus johanseni
Bombus jonellus – small heath bumble bee
Bombus kotzschi
Bombus lapponicus
Bombus lemniscatus
Bombus lepidus
Bombus luteipes
Bombus melanopygus – black-tailed bumble bee
Bombus mirus
Bombus mixtus – fuzzy-horned bumble bee
Bombus modestus
Bombus monticola – bilberry bumble bee
Bombus oceanicus
Bombus parthenius
Bombus perplexus – perplexing bumble bee, confusing bumble bee
Bombus picipes
Bombus pratorum – early bumble bee
Bombus pressus
Bombus pyrenaeus
Bombus rotundiceps
Bombus sandersoni – Sanderson bumble bee<ref name=TEA>Miller, Nathan G. (2010). The Bumble Bees of Algonquin Park: A Field Guide. Toronto: Toronto Entomologists' Association. pp.22.</ref>Bombus sitkensis – Sitka bumble beeBombus sonaniBombus subtypicusBombus sylvicola – forest bumble beeBombus ternarius – tricolored bumble bee, orange-belted bumble beeBombus vagans – half-black bumble beeBombus vancouverensisBombus vandykei – Van Dyke's bumble beeBombus vosnesenskii – yellow-faced bumble beeBombus wilmattaeSubgenus SibiricobombusBombus asiaticusBombus morawitziBombus niveatusBombus obertiBombus obtususBombus sibiricusBombus sulfureusSubgenus SubterraneobombusBombus amurensisBombus appositus – mountain bumble beeBombus borealis – northern amber bumble beeBombus difficillimusBombus distinguendusBombus fedtschenkoiBombus fragransBombus melanurusBombus mongolensisBombus personatusBombus subterraneus – short-haired bumble bee

Subgenus ThoracobombusBombus anachoretaBombus armeniacus – Armenian bumble beeBombus atripesBombus bahiensisBombus bellicosusBombus brasiliensisBombus brevivillusBombus californicusBombus dahlbomiiBombus deuteronymusBombus digressusBombus diligensBombus excellensBombus exilBombus fervidus – yellow bumble bee, golden northern bumble beeBombus filchneraeBombus hediniBombus honshuensisBombus humilis – brown-banded carder beeBombus imitatorBombus impetuosusBombus inexspectatusBombus laesusBombus mediusBombus mesomelasBombus mexicanusBombus mlokosievitziiBombus morioBombus mucidusBombus muscorum – large carder bee or moss carder beeBombus opifexBombus opulentusBombus pascuorum – common carder beeBombus pauloensisBombus pensylvanicus – American bumble beeBombus persicusBombus pomorum – apple humble-beeBombus pseudobaicalensisBombus pullatusBombus remotusBombus rubriventris (probably extinct)Bombus ruderarius – red-shanked carder bee or red-shanked bumble beeBombus schrenckiBombus sonorus – Sonoran bumble beeBombus steindachneriBombus sylvarum – shrill carder beeBombus transversalisBombus tricornisBombus trinominatusBombus veloxBombus weisiBombus veteranusBombus zonatusSubgenus incertae sedis
†“Bombus” anacolus - Middle Miocene Shanwang Formation, Shandong Province, China
†Bombus? crassipes - Late Miocene Krottensee deposits, Czech Republic
†“Bombus” dilectus - Middle Miocene Shanwang Formation, Shandong Province, China
†“Bombus” luianus - Middle Miocene Shanwang Formation, Shandong Province, China
†Bombus proavus - Middle Miocene, Latah Formation, Washington, USA
†Bombus vetustus - Late Miocene, Botchi Formation, Botchi River, Khabarovsk Krai, Russia

Genus †Calyptapis
†Calyptapis florissantensis - Late Eocene, Florissant Formation, Colorado

Genus †Oligobombus
†Oligobombus cuspidatus'' - Late Eocene, Bembridge Marls, Isle of Wight, UK

References 

 List
Bumblebee species
Bumblebees